Baldwin Township is a civil township in Barnes County, North Dakota, United States. As of the 2000 census, its population was 34.

References

Townships in Barnes County, North Dakota
Townships in North Dakota